Renault Sherpa 5 is a tactical military truck made by Renault Trucks Defense, a subsidiary of Renault Trucks. It evolved from the Renault GBC 180.

Description 
Renault Sherpa 5 was debuted at the 2004 Eurosatory military trade fair. The vehicle is an all-wheel drive truck (in 4×4 or 6×6 configurations) that can carry a payload of seven tons. It is used for transport in war zones - the French armed forces use the truck as a chassis for the CAESAR self-propelled howitzer.

External links 

  CAESAR Renault Sherpa 5 Nexter wheeled self-propelled howitzer

References 

Wheeled military vehicles
Military vehicles of France
GBC 180
Military trucks of France
Off-road vehicles
Military vehicles introduced in the 2000s